Prabir Acharya (born 3 November 1961) is an Indian former cricketer. He played two first-class matches for Bengal in 1995/96.

See also
 List of Bengal cricketers

References

External links
 

1961 births
Living people
Indian cricketers
Bengal cricketers
Cricketers from Kolkata